Urengoy (Nenets: Пюра ңо, Pjura ŋo) is an urban locality (an urban-type settlement) in Purovsky District of Yamalo-Nenets Autonomous Okrug, Russia. Population:

History
Urengoy was founded in 1932 as a Nenets settlement. Between 1949 and 1953, the construction of the railway between Salekhard and Igarka was coordinated from Urengoy, and a large number of convicted prisoners were moved to Urengoy to work on the construction sites. The construction was frozen in 1953, and the prisoners were moved out of Urengoy. The railway was never completed.

Economy
The Urengoy gas field was named after the settlement.

References

Urban-type settlements in Yamalo-Nenets Autonomous Okrug